pretty Easy privacy (p≡p or pEp) is a pluggable data encryption and verification system, which provides automatic cryptographic key management through a set of libraries (providing p≡p adapters for application developers' used programming languages and development environments) for written digital communications. Its main goal is to make end-to-end encryption the default in written digital communications for all users in the easiest way possible and on the channels they already make use of, including e-mails, SMS, or other types of messages.

It exists as a plugin for Microsoft Outlook and Mozilla Thunderbird as well as a mobile app for Android and iOS. p≡p also works under Microsoft Windows, Unix-like and, Mac OS X operating systems. Its cryptographic functionality is handled by an open-source p≡p engine relying on already existing cryptographic implementations in software like GnuPG, a modified version of netpgp (used only in iOS), and (as of p≡p v2.0) GNUnet.

In its default configuration, p≡p does not rely on a web of trust or any form of centralized trust infrastructure, but instead lets users verify each other's authenticity by comparing cryptographic fingerprints in the form of natural language strings, which the p≡p developers have chosen to call "trust words".

pretty Easy privacy was first released in 2016. All software already released, including p≡p engine, adapters, apps and add-ons (including Microsoft Outlook), is free and open-source software.

In March 2021, it was revealed that the company behind pEp paid for fake reviews for their apps.

Design principles

Above all, p≡p – supposedly contrary to existing cryptographic solutions – should be easy to install, use and understand. Furthermore, for their communications, p≡p users do not depend on any specific platform, message transport system (SMS, email, XMPP, etc.), or centrally provided client–server or "cloud" infrastructures: p≡p is fully peer-to-peer by design.

Keys are exchanged opportunistically by transferring via email.

Enigmail support 
Enigmail announced its support for the new "pretty Easy privacy" (p≡p) encryption scheme in a joint Thunderbird extension to be released in December 2015. Patrick Brunschwig, the head of Enigmail, announced to have p≡p core functionality implemented in Enigmail during October 2016, ready for Mozilla Festival then taking place in London.

In July 2020, Thunderbird 78 dropped support for the Enigmail Add-On. Thunderbird 78 includes OpenPGP functionality, and no longer requires the installation of external software.

ISOC support 
Internet Society Switzerland Chapter (ISOC-CH) and the Swiss p≡p foundation teamed up to provide a practical solution, namely to implement privacy-enhancing standards at the basic level of internet protocols and document them in the work of the Internet Engineering Task Force (IETF), the main organization creating voluntary standards to maintain and improve the usability and interoperability of the internet.

See also 

 GNU Privacy Guard
 Pretty Good Privacy

References

External links 

 
 Official p≡p foundation website
 Official Manual

Cryptographic software
Security